Balagny-Saint-Épin is a railway station located in the commune of Balagny-sur-Thérain in the Oise department, France, it is also located near the settlement of Saint-Épin in the commune of Bury.  The station is served by TER Hauts-de-France trains (Beauvais - Creil line).

See also
List of SNCF stations in Hauts-de-France

References

Railway stations in Oise
Railway stations in France opened in 1857